Anthidium masunariae is a species of bee in the family Megachilidae, the leaf-cutter, carder, or mason bees.

Distribution
Peru

References

masunariae
Insects described in 2001